Tvrtko of Bosnia may refer to:

 Tvrtko I of Bosnia, medieval ban, and king of Bosnia (1353-1366 and 1367-1391)
 Tvrtko II of Bosnia, medieval king of Bosnia (1404–1409 and again 1421–1443)

See also
Tvrtko (disambiguation)
Tvrtko Kotromanić (disambiguation)
List of rulers of Bosnia